Joyce Melissa Morgan (usually spelled Meli'sa; born December 6, 1964) is an American R&B/Soul singer–songwriter. Morgan had a string of urban contemporary hits from the mid–1980s to the mid–1990s. Most notable include her cover version of Prince's "Do Me, Baby" (1985), "Do You Still Love Me" (1986) and "Still in Love with You" (1992).

Early life 
Born in Queens, New York, Morgan got her start in the music industry while singing with a church gospel choir called the Starlets of Corona. Morgan cites Chaka Khan as a major influence.

Career

1982–1992
Her initial chart entry was as the lead singer of the dance group, Shades of Love. They had a single entry at #26 on Billboard magazine's Hot Dance Club Play chart in 1982 with "Body to Body (Keep in Touch)." This was re-popularized in 1994 by new remixes and reached number 1 on the same chart. That same year, music entrepreneur Jacques Fred Petrus asked her to join his newly created studio group, High Fashion, that featured Morgan and two other New York vocalists, Eric McClinton and Alyson Williams. High Fashion's sole hit, "Feelin' Lucky Lately," reached #32 on the US Black Singles chart. In 1983, Morgan left, and was replaced in the group by the jazz vocalist, Marcella Allen. Morgan worked as a backing singer with Chaka Khan, Whitney Houston, and Melba Moore. 

As a solo artist, she topped the R&B chart with her cover version of Prince's "Do Me, Baby" for 3 weeks, (the title track from her debut album) which also became her only Billboard Hot 100 entry, peaking at number 46 in 1986. She also had a top 5 R&B single with "Do You Still Love Me" from her debut album. She had several solo hits on the US dance chart as well, including "Still in Love with You," which hit #3 in 1992.

A verse from Morgan's 1986 single "Fool's Paradise" was re-vamped, with modified lyrics, by Mary J. Blige as the chorus to the 1996 Jay-Z single "Can't Knock the Hustle."

2005–present
After a lengthy hiatus, Morgan released her fifth solo album, I Remember. The first single, "Back Together Again", a song originally recorded by Roberta Flack and Donny Hathaway, received moderate airplay on urban contemporary radio stations during early 2006 and peaked at number 46 on Billboard's R&B chart. The follow-up singles included "I Remember," "Will You?," and "High Maintenance" which were released in September 2006. New material by Meli'sa Morgan can be heard on a German release by Cool Million, which features Meli'sa Morgan on lead vocals on the opening track "Sweet Baby."

In 2014, Morgan was honored with an Unsung Heroine Award by the National R&B Music Society at Resorts Casino in Atlantic City, NJ.

Morgan was featured on an episode of TVOne's Unsung which aired in 2015.

Personal life
Morgan was married to playwright, writer, and director Shelly Garrett from 1993 until 1994.

Discography

Studio albums

Compilation albums

Singles

See also
List of number-one dance hits (United States)
List of artists who reached number one on the US Dance chart

References

External links

1964 births
Living people
American soul musicians
American dance musicians
Musicians from Queens, New York
American soul singers
American contemporary R&B singers
African-American women singer-songwriters
21st-century American women singers
21st-century American singers
21st-century African-American women singers
20th-century African-American people
20th-century African-American women
Singer-songwriters from New York (state)